The historic prime meridian or Greenwich meridian is a geographical reference line that passes through the Royal Observatory, Greenwich, in London, England. The modern IERS Reference Meridian widely used today is based on the Greenwich meridian, but differs slightly from it. This prime meridian (at the time, one of many) was first established by Sir George Airy in 1851, and by 1884, over two-thirds of all ships and tonnage used it as the reference meridian on their charts and maps. In October of that year, at the behest of US President Chester A. Arthur, 41 delegates from 25 nations met in Washington, D.C., United States, for the International Meridian Conference. This conference selected the meridian passing through Greenwich as the world standard prime meridian due to its popularity. However, France abstained from the vote, and French maps continued to use the Paris meridian for several decades. In the 18th century, London lexicographer Malachy Postlethwayt published his African maps showing the "Meridian of London" intersecting the Equator a few degrees west of the later meridian and Accra, Ghana.

The plane of the prime meridian is parallel to the local gravity vector at the Airy transit circle of the Greenwich observatory. The prime meridian was therefore long symbolised by a brass strip in the courtyard, now replaced by stainless steel, and since 16 December 1999, it has been marked by a powerful green laser shining north across the London night sky.

Global Positioning System (GPS) receivers show that the marking strip for the prime meridian at Greenwich is not exactly at zero degrees, zero minutes, and zero seconds but at approximately 5.3 seconds of arc to the west of the meridian (meaning that the meridian appears to be 102 metres east). In the past, this offset has been attributed to the establishment of reference meridians for space-based location systems such as WGS 84 (which GPS relies on) or that errors gradually crept into the International Time Bureau timekeeping process. The actual reason for the discrepancy is that the difference between precise GNSS coordinates and astronomically determined coordinates everywhere remains a localized gravity effect due to vertical deflection; thus, no systematic rotation of global longitudes occurred between the former astronomical system and the current geodetic system.

History

Before the establishment of a common meridian, most maritime countries established their own prime meridian, usually passing through the country in question. In 1721, Great Britain established its own meridian passing through an early transit circle at the newly established Royal Observatory at Greenwich.  The meridian was moved around 10 metres or so east on three occasions as transit circles with newer and better instruments were built, on each occasion next door to the existing one. This was to allow uninterrupted observation during each new construction. The final meridian was established as an imaginary line from the north pole to the south pole passing through the Airy transit circle. This became the United Kingdom's meridian in 1851. For all practical purposes of the period, the changes as the meridian was moved went unnoticed.

Transit instruments are installed to be perpendicular to the local level (which is a plane perpendicular to a plumb line). In 1884, the International Meridian Conference took place in Washington, D.C. to establish an internationally recognised single meridian. The meridian chosen was that which passed through the Airy transit circle at Greenwich, and it became the prime meridian of the world.

At around the time of this conference, scientists were making measurements to determine the deflection of the vertical on a large scale. One might expect that plumb lines set up in various locations, if extended downward, would all pass through a single point, the centre of the Earth, but this is not the case, primarily due to the Earth being an ellipsoid, not a sphere. The downward extended plumb lines don't even all intersect the rotation axis of the Earth; this much smaller effect is due to the uneven distribution of the Earth's mass. To make computations feasible, scientists defined ellipsoids of revolution, more closely emulating the shape of the Earth, modified for a particular zone; a published ellipsoid would be a good base line for measurements. The difference between the direction of a plumb line or vertical, and a line perpendicular to the surface of the ellipsoid of revolution a normal to said ellipsoid at a particular observatory, is the deflection of the vertical.

When the Airy transit circle was built, a mercury basin was used to align the telescope to the perpendicular. Thus the circle was aligned with the local vertical or plumb line, which is deflected slightly from the normal, or line perpendicular, to the reference ellipsoid used to define geodetic latitude and longitude in the International Terrestrial Reference Frame (which is nearly the same as the WGS-84 system used by GPS). While Airy's local vertical, set by the apparent centre of gravity of the earth still points to (aligns with) the modern celestial meridian (the intersection of the prime meridian plane with the celestial sphere), it does not pass through the Earth's rotation axis. As a result of this, the ITRF zero meridian, defined by a plane passing through the Earth's rotation axis, is 102.478 metres to the east of the prime meridian. A 2015 analysis by Malys et al. shows the offset between the former and the latter can be explained by this deflection of the vertical alone; other possible sources of the offset that have been proposed in the past are smaller than the current uncertainty in the deflection of the vertical, locally. The astronomical longitude of the Greenwich prime meridian was found to be 0.19″ ± 0.47″ East, i.e. the plane defined by the local vertical on the Greenwich prime meridian and the plane passing through the Earth's rotation axis on the ITRF zero meridian are effectively parallel. Claims, such as that on the BBC website, that the gap between astronomical and geodetic coordinates means that any measurements of transit time across the IRTF zero meridian will occur precisely 0.352 seconds (or 0.353 sidereal seconds) before the transit across the "intended meridian" are based on a failure of understanding. The explanation by Malys et al. on the other hand is more studied and correct.

Meridian today

As of 2020 the Greenwich meridian passes through eight countries from north to south:

 United Kingdom (specifically, only England)
 France
 Spain 
 Algeria
 Mali
 Burkina Faso
 Togo
 Ghana

It also passes through Antarctica (only touching Queen Maud Land, the territorial claim of Norway). 

It crosses the maritime Exclusive Economic Zones of:
 Greenland (Denmark)
 Norway (via proximity to Svalbard, Jan Mayen Island and the Norwegian mainland in the North Atlantic and Bouvet Island in the South Atlantic)

See also 
 180th meridian
 Prime meridian
 Greenwich Mean Time
 IERS Reference Meridian
 United Kingdom Ordnance Survey Zero Meridian

Notes

References

External links

 "Where the Earth's surface begins—and ends", Popular Mechanics, December 1930

 A pictorial catalogue of meridian markers

Named meridians
Geography of the Royal Borough of Greenwich
1884 establishments in the British Empire
English inventions
Prime meridians
1851 establishments in the United Kingdom
1721 establishments in Great Britain
Royal Observatory, Greenwich